Ligilactobacillus salivarius is a probiotic bacteria species that has been found to live in the gastrointestinal tract and exert a range of therapeutic properties including suppression of pathogenic bacteria.

Therapeutic research

Irritable bowel syndrome 
Ligilactobacillus salivarius has been found to be of benefit in the alleviation of flatulence in individuals suffering from irritable bowel syndrome.

Pancreatic necrosis 
Pancreatic necrosis, if left untreated, has an almost 100 percent fatality rate due to bacterial translocation. Ligilactobacillus salivarius has been found to have a wide spectrum of coverage against pathogenic organisms that translocate from the gastrointestinal tract thereby demonstrating therapeutic benefit in the management of pancreatic necrosis. Research has shown that the addition of this species along with other probiotic species (specifically Bifidobacterium bifidum, Bifidobacterium infantis, Lactobacillus acidophilus, Lacticaseibacillus casei, and Lactococcus lactis) suppressed pro-inflammatory cytokines and further suppressed bacterial overgrowth in the small intestine leading to a reduction in bacterial translocation.

Atopic dermatitis 
Atopic dermatitis symptoms have been shown to be reversed in some children.

References

External links
Type strain of Lactobacillus salivarius at BacDive -  the Bacterial Diversity Metadatabase

Lactobacillaceae
Bacteria described in 1953